Gredos may refer to:

 Sierra de Gredos, a mountain range in the centre of the Iberian Peninsula
 Circo de Gredos, a glacial cirque situated in the central part of the northern slope of the Sierra de Gredos of the Iberian Peninsula
 Navarredonda de Gredos, a municipality located in the province of Ávila, Castile and León, Spain.
 San Juan de Gredos,  a municipality located in the province of Ávila, Castile and León, Spain.
 Western Spanish ibex or Gredos ibex, a vulnerable goat endemic to Spain and Portugal.
 SEAT Gredos, a car model by the Spanish automaker SEAT